Austin Lance Adams (born May 5, 1991) is an American professional baseball pitcher in the Arizona Diamondbacks organization. He has previously played in Major League Baseball (MLB) for the Washington Nationals, Seattle Mariners and San Diego Padres.

Career
Adams attended Zephyrhills High School in Zephyrhills, Florida, where he played baseball and basketball and played college baseball at the University of South Florida.  He pursued a degree in physical education. In 2012, his junior year, he went 1–2 with a 1.95 ERA in 27.2 relief innings pitched.

Los Angeles Angels
The Los Angeles Angels of Anaheim selected Adams in the eighth round of the 2012 Major League Baseball draft. He began his professional career playing for the Orem Owlz in the Rookie Advanced-level Pioneer League during the 2012 season. He spent 2013 with the Class A Burlington Bees in the Midwest League and 2014 with the Class A Advanced Inland Empire 66ers in the California League. He began the 2015 season with Inland Empire, then was promoted during the season first to the Class AA Arkansas Travelers in the Texas League and then to the Class AAA Salt Lake Bees in the Pacific Coast League. He split the 2016 season between the Rookie-level AZL Angels in the Arizona League and the Class AA Arkansas Travelers.

The Los Angeles Angels of Anaheim added Adams to their 40-man roster after the 2016 season. On December 10, 2016, they traded Adams and Kyle McGowin to the Washington Nationals for infielder Danny Espinosa.

Washington Nationals

2017
Adams began the 2017 season with the Class- AAA Syracuse Chiefs of the International League. With the Nationals' bullpen struggling over the first half of the 2017 season, Adams was mentioned by The Washington Post in a July 12 article among several minor league pitchers the team could consider calling upon as reinforcements. Two days later, Adams was called up to the big leagues for the first time, along with Syracuse teammate Trevor Gott, after the Nationals optioned struggling left-handed reliever Sammy Solis and assigned ailing starter Joe Ross to the disabled list with an elbow sprain. Adams made his major league debut on July 15, 2017, against the Cincinnati Reds, loading the bases on an error, a walk, and a wild pitch and then walking in a run and allowing a single before he was pulled from the game. Adams was optioned back to Syracuse on July 18, his earned run average still standing at infinity due to the earned run he allowed without recording an out. Adams was recalled by the Nationals on September 1, 2017, and recorded his first major league outs in an inning of relief against the Milwaukee Brewers on September 3, after loading the bases.

2018
Adams began 2018 with Triple-A Syracuse. On April 22, the Nationals called him up to the major leagues. He pitched on April 25 in a 15-2 Washington win over the San Francisco Giants at AT&T Park in San Francisco, giving up a hit and a walk but no runs in one inning of work. On April 28, Nationals manager Dave Martinez brought him in to relieve left-hander Sammy Solis in the 10th inning of a game at Nationals Park in Washington, D.C., against the Arizona Diamondbacks with one out, runners on second and third, and the score tied 3–3. Martinez intended Adams to face right-handed utility player Chris Owings, who was waiting in the on-deck circle. However, Martinez made the mistake of making the pitching change before the public address announcer had announced Owings as the batter. With Adams in the game, Diamondbacks manager Torey Lovullo took advantage of Martinez's error by recalling Owings and sending left-handed outfielder Jarrod Dyson to the plate, forcing Adams to face a left-hander rather than a right-hander as Martinez had intended. Adams walked Dyson to load the bases. With only one reliever – Carlos Torres –  remaining in the Washington bullpen, Martinez left Adams in to face the next batter, center fielder A. J. Pollock, as well, and Adams also walked Pollock, forcing in what turned out to be the winning run in a 4–3 Diamondbacks victory. On April 29, the Nationals optioned Adams back to Syracuse. Adams was designated for assignment on April 30, 2019, following the selecting of Dan Jennings’ contract.

Seattle Mariners
On May 4, 2019, the Nationals traded Adams to the Seattle Mariners for left-handed minor-league pitcher Nick Wells and cash considerations. He was assigned to the Tacoma Rainiers. On May 13, he was called up to the major league roster. He registered an ERA of 3.77 in 29 games.

San Diego Padres
On August 30, 2020, the Mariners traded Adams, Austin Nola, and Dan Altavilla to the San Diego Padres for Ty France, Taylor Trammell, Andrés Muñoz, and Luis Torrens.

Adams had problems with control in his 2021 MLB season.  On September 1, 2021, Adams became the first MLB pitcher to ever register 20 or more hit by pitch with less than 50 IPs in a season. Adams is the first pitcher to record a HBP 20 times or more since 2004. During his 8-pitch outing, he hit batters 2 times, walked 1 batter, gave up 1 hit, and registered 0 strikes. 

On September 12, he became the first pitcher since 1923 to record 23 or more hit by pitches in a season.  His final HBP of the season was on September 17, against Yadier Molina of the St. Louis Cardinals in the bottom of the 8th inning.  Adams finished the season with 24 HBPs, a new record in the live-ball era.

On March 22, 2022, Adams signed a $0.925 million contract with the Padres, avoiding salary arbitration. On April 28, Adams was placed on the 60-day injured list after receiving a platelet-rich plasma injection for a strained right forearm.

Arizona Diamondbacks
On January 25, 2023, Adams signed a minor league contract with the Arizona Diamondbacks organization.

Pitching style
In 2014, a report on Scout.com took note of Adams' "loud, earth-shattering slider", describing it as a pitch "like hardly any other". Adams also throws a fastball in the 92-94 mph range. Despite an effective two-pitch mix, Adams has been noted for problems with his command, walking more than seven batters per nine innings in the first half of the 2017 season with the Class-AAA Syracuse Chiefs.  Adams' problems with control came back in the 2021 MLB season.  He led the league in hit by pitches (HBP) with 24 HBPs despite being a reliever with fewer innings pitched than most other pitchers.

References

External links

1991 births
Living people
Baseball players from Tampa, Florida
Major League Baseball pitchers
Washington Nationals players
Seattle Mariners players
San Diego Padres players
South Florida Bulls baseball players
Orem Owlz players
Burlington Bees players
Inland Empire 66ers of San Bernardino players
Arkansas Travelers players
Salt Lake Bees players
Arizona League Angels players
Tigres de Aragua players
American expatriate baseball players in Venezuela
Syracuse Chiefs players
Fresno Grizzlies players
Tacoma Rainiers players